In music, Op. 51 stands for Opus number 51. Compositions that are assigned this number include:

 Arnold – Tam O'Shanter Overture
 Beethoven – Two rondos for piano
 Brahms – Two String Quartets
 Chopin – Impromptu No. 3
 Dvořák – String Quartet No. 10
 Elgar – The Kingdom
 Fibich – Šárka
 Holst – A Choral Fantasia
 MacDowell – Woodland Sketches
 Prokofiev – On the Dnieper
 Schubert – Three Marches Militaires
 Schumann – Lieder und Gesänge volume II (5 songs)
 Scriabin – Prelude in A minor, Op. 51, No. 2
 Sibelius – Belshazzar's Feast